The 1966 Saint Louis Billikens men's soccer team was Saint Louis University's competitive soccer team for the 1966 NCAA Division I men's soccer season. They advanced to, but were defeated in the Quarterfinals of the 1966 NCAA Soccer tournament by eventual champion San Francisco, which was the earliest playoff exit in the Billikens' history up to that point. The team finished with a 7-4-3 record for the season.

This season was the worst season by the Billikens in the team's history up to that point. Their results for the regular season and playoffs are below:

The Billikens started 2-3-1, but after their loss to Kurtis they did not lose again until the quarterfinals of the playoffs.

|-
!colspan=6 style=""| Regular season
|-

|-
!colspan=6 style=""| NCAA Tournament
|-

References

Saint Louis
Saint Louis Billikens men's soccer seasons
1966 in sports in Missouri